Armour (2021 population 1,459) is a township municipality in the Canadian province of Ontario.

Located in the Almaguin Highlands region of Parry Sound District, the township surrounds but does not include the village of Burk's Falls. It was named in honour of Judge John Douglas Armour.

Communities
The township includes the communities of Berriedale, Carss, Chetwynd, Katrine and Pickerel Lake.

Katrine overlooks Doe Lake, which is located on the west side of the village. Three Mile Lake and Deer Lake are located about 5 km east of the village. There is also a small public beach on Doe Lake, and a community centre located on Ontario Highway 11.

Demographics

Mother tongue (2006):
 English as first language: 92.4%
 French as first language: 2.4%
 English and French as first language: 0%
 Other as first language: 5.2%

See also
 List of municipalities in Ontario
List of townships in Ontario

References

External links
 

Municipalities in Parry Sound District
Single-tier municipalities in Ontario
Township municipalities in Ontario